Rosslare may refer to:

Rosslare Strand, a village in County Wexford, Ireland
 Rosslare Harbour, a village in County Wexford, Ireland
The Rosslare Europort, at Rosslare Harbour